The Amir Amanullah Khan Award is the highest civilian award of the Islamic Republic of Afghanistan. It was instituted in 2006 and is bestowed by the Government of Afghanistan to Afghan and foreign nationals in recognition of their services to Afghanistan. The award is named for Ghazi Amanullah Khan, the Sovereign of the Kingdom of Afghanistan from 1919 to 1929. The citation on the reverse of the medal states, "Nishan-e dawlati Ghazi Amir Amanullah Khan", meaning "State Order of Ghazi Amir Amanullah Khan."

Notable recipients
 Indian Prime Minister Narendra Modi
 US President George W. Bush
 Kazakh President Nursultan Nazarbayev
 Turkish President Recep Tayyip Erdogan
 Indonesian President Joko Widodo
 NATO General James Logan Jones
 Afghan President spiritual leader Sibghatullah Mujaddedi
 Afghan Chief Justice Abdul Salam Azimi

References

Orders, decorations, and medals of Afghanistan
Awards established in 2006
2006 establishments in Afghanistan